This was the first edition of the tournament.

Anastasija Sevastova won the title, defeating Katarzyna Kawa in the final, 3–6, 7–5, 6–4.

Seeds

Draw

Finals

Top half

Bottom half

Qualifying

Seeds

Qualifiers

Draw

First qualifier

Second qualifier

Third qualifier

Fourth qualifier

Fifth qualifier

Sixth qualifier

References

Sources
Main Draw
 Qualifying Draw

Baltic Open - Singles
2019 Singles